Christopher Bethell-Codrington (until 1797 known as Christopher Codrington; October 1764 – 4 February 1843) was a British politician, planter and amateur cricket player who served as a MP in the British Parliament.

In 1792, he inherited from his uncle Sir William Codrington, 2nd Baronet, sugar plantations in Antigua and the Dodington Park estate in Gloucestershire. In 1797 he inherited further Caribbean property from his uncle Christopher Bethell, who had changed his name after inheriting the estates from his maternal uncle Slingsby Bethell in 1758.  He then changed his surname to Bethell-Codrington.

Parliamentary career
Later in 1797 he was elected as a Member of Parliament (MP) for Tewkesbury, holding the seat until 1812.

In 1806 he rejected pressure from his constituents to support the abolition of the slave trade, but denied being motivated by his self-interest as a plantation-owner. Later in 1832, he had a very public debate in the newspapers with Sir Fowell Buxton on abolition, quoting a letter from his attorney and resident manager for Barbuda in 1825, John James, detailing the supposed contentedness of the slaves there.

In 1817, he purchased further lands at Wapley in Gloucestershire, which made his estate "extend upwards of 15 miles in one continued line".

Caribbean estates
Christopher Bethell-Codrington's sugar estates included Betty's Hope, Clare Hall, Garden, Cotton, New Work, Bolans, and Jennings, on the island of Antigua and also the island of Barbuda which was used to supply the sugar estates with provisions and also earned commissions by salvaging the many ship wrecks on its reefs.
These estates were managed by resident managers and attorneys. Many of their letters back to Christopher Bethell-Codrington at Dodington Park still exist and are available to read on microfilm and PDF in a collection known as the Codrington Papers. In the 1830s, the British government emancipated the slaves, and Bethell-Codrington was compensated over £30,000 for nearly 500 slaves in his ownership.

Cricket career
He was mainly associated with Marylebone Cricket Club (MCC) and made five known appearances in first-class cricket matches in 1797.

References

1764 births
1843 deaths
British MPs 1796–1800
English cricketers
English cricketers of 1787 to 1825
English landowners
Marylebone Cricket Club cricketers
Members of the Parliament of Great Britain for English constituencies
Members of the Parliament of the United Kingdom for English constituencies
British slave owners
Sugar plantation owners
UK MPs 1801–1802
UK MPs 1802–1806
UK MPs 1806–1807
UK MPs 1807–1812
Christopher
Colonel C. Lennox's XI cricketers